Salisbury-Elk Lick Junior/Senior High School is a public secondary school, located only two miles north of the Mason–Dixon line in the small town of Salisbury, Somerset County, Pennsylvania. The Junior - Senior High School was built in 1954, at a cost of $550,000.00. Students first occupied the building on January 21, 1955. This new building consisted of six class rooms and special rooms for the commercial department, library, homemaking, music, art, geography and science, and a suite of rooms for industrial arts, cafeteria, administrative suite and a gym/auditorium seating nearly 700. The building was renovated in the early 21st century.

Graduation requirements
According to the Student Handbook students attending Salisbury-Elk Lick need a minimum of 25 credits in grades 9-12 and to complete a Graduation Project as well as pass the PSSA exam.

Credit structure

Athletics
Salisbury-Elk Lick participates in PIAA District V:

References

Public high schools in Pennsylvania
Educational institutions established in 1954
Schools in Somerset County, Pennsylvania
Public middle schools in Pennsylvania
1954 establishments in Pennsylvania